Pumuta (Aymara puma cougar, puma, uta house, "puma house") is a mountain in the Andes of Bolivia, about  high. It is situated in the Oruro Department, Sajama Province, Curahuara de Carangas Municipality, Sajama Canton, north-west of the extinct Sajama volcano. Pumuta lies south-west of the mountain Jach'a Kunturiri and north-east to east of the mountains Kunturiri and Jisk'a Kunturiri.

The Kunturiri River originates south of the mountain. It flows to the south and then to the east as a tributary of the Sajama River.

See also
 Sajama National Park
List of mountains in the Andes

References 

Mountains of Oruro Department